Joseph Chaplik is an American politician who is one of the Arizona state representatives in Arizona's 3rd district. He was originally elected to the district 23 seat after defeating incumbent Republican Jay Lawrence in a primary election. He and incumbent John Kavanagh won in a twoseat election in 2020, both defeating Democrat Eric Kurland by over 15,000 votes. He was reelected in 2022 to the 3rd district, after redistricting.

References

Living people
Republican Party members of the Arizona House of Representatives
21st-century American politicians
Year of birth missing (living people)